Gregory Funk is an American make-up artist. He was nominated for an Academy Award in the category Best Makeup and Hairstyling for the film The Way Back. Funk also won three Primetime Emmy Awards and was nominated for two more in the category Outstanding Makeup.

Selected filmography 
 The Way Back (2010; co-nominated with Edouard F. Henriques and Yolanda Toussieng)

References

External links 

Living people
Year of birth missing (living people)
Place of birth missing (living people)
American make-up artists
Primetime Emmy Award winners